Candiopella is a genus of snout moths. It was described by Boris Balinsky in 1994 and is known from South Africa and Réunion.

Species
 Candiopella dukei Balinsky, 1994
 Candiopella reunionalis Guillermet, 2007

References

Phycitinae